Marco Gerini (born 5 August 1971) is an Italian water polo player who competed in the 1996 Summer Olympics and in the 2004 Summer Olympics.

See also
 Italy men's Olympic water polo team records and statistics
 List of Olympic medalists in water polo (men)
 List of men's Olympic water polo tournament goalkeepers
 List of World Aquatics Championships medalists in water polo

References

External links
 

1971 births
Living people
Italian male water polo players
Water polo goalkeepers
Olympic water polo players of Italy
Water polo players at the 1996 Summer Olympics
Water polo players at the 2004 Summer Olympics
Olympic bronze medalists for Italy
Olympic medalists in water polo
World Aquatics Championships medalists in water polo
Medalists at the 1996 Summer Olympics
Water polo players from Rome